The Dream Mile may refer to the annual Diamond League race in Oslo at Bislett Stadium, or several historic individual races featuring top middle-distance runners.

Dream Mile (Bislett)

The Dream Mile is an annual mile race run at Bislett Stadium, Oslo as part of the Bislett Games, one of the meetings of the Diamond League athletics competition.  This annual event was interrupted in 2004 for the rebuilding of Bislett Stadium, replacing a six-lane track with sharp bends and steep terraces with a conventional eight-lane track and seating. In 1980, the world mile record was set in this race by Steve Ovett, and in 1985 Steve Cram also set a new world mile record.

Numerous National records were set in the Bislett Dream Mile, including current records:  Great Britain (Steve Cram), Spain (José Luis González), Qatar (Daham Najim Bashir),  Australia (Craig Mottram), New Zealand (John Walker), Germany (Jens-Peter Herold), Somalia (Abdi Bile), Portugal (Rui Silva), Ireland (Ray Flynn), Canada (Kevin Sullivan), Brazil (Hudson de Souza) and Saudi Arabia (Mohammed Shaween). The 2017 race was held as an under-20s competition.

Winners
2021: Stewart McSweyn (AUS) 3:48.37
2020: Not held
2019: Marcin Lewandowski (POL) 3:52.34
2018: Elijah Manangoi (KEN) 3:56.95
2017: Jakob Ingebrigtsen (NOR) 3:56.29
2016: Asbel Kiprop (KEN) 3:51.48
2015: Asbel Kiprop (KEN) 3:51.45 
2014: Ayanleh Souleiman (DJI) 3:49.49
2013: Ayanleh Souleiman (DJI) 3:50.53
2012: Asbel Kiprop (KEN) 3:49.22
2011: Asbel Kiprop (KEN) 3:50.86
2010: Asbel Kiprop (KEN) 3:49.56
2009: Deresse Mekonnen (ETH) 3:48.95
2008: Andrew Baddeley (GBR) 3:49.38
2007: Adil Kaouch (MAR) 3:51.14
2006: Alex Kipchirchir (KEN) 3:50.32
2005: Daham Najim Bashir (QAT) 3:47.97
2004: Not held 
2003: Not held
2002: Hicham El Guerrouj (MAR) 3:50.12
2001: Ali Saïdi-Sief (ALG) 3:48.23
2000: Hicham El Guerrouj (MAR) 3:46.24
1999: Not held
1998: Not held (Meet had 1500 m)
1997: Hicham El Guerrouj (MAR) 3:44.90
1996: Noureddine Morceli (ALG) 3:48.15
1995: Not held (Meet had 1500 m)
1994: Vénuste Niyongabo (BDI) 3:48.94 	
1993: Noureddine Morceli (ALG) 3:47.78
1992: David Kibet (KEN) 3:52.32
1991: Peter Elliott (GBR) 3:49.46
1990: Joe Falcon (USA) 3:49.31
1988: Steve Cram (GBR) 3:48.85
1987: Steve Cram (GBR) 3:50.08
1986: Steve Cram (GBR) 3:48.31
1985: Steve Cram (GBR) 3:46.32 
1984: Not held (Meet had 1500 m)
1983: Steve Scott (USA) 3:49.49
1982: Steve Scott (USA) 3:47.69
1981: Tom Byers (USA) 
1980: Steve Ovett (GBR) 3:48.8 
1979: Sebastian Coe (GBR) 3:49.0 
1978: Wilson Waigwa (KEN) 3:53.2
1977: ?
1976: John Walker (NZL) 3:55.5+
1975: ?
1974: Knut Kvalheim (NOR) 3:56.2

Other "Dream Miles"
The term "Dream Mile" is also used to describe several other major athletics events, notably the 1974 Commonwealth Games 1500 metres race ("metric mile") fought out between Filbert Bayi and John Walker in Christchurch, New Zealand. This was described by Duncan Mackay in The Observer as "...a race to rival the 'Miracle Mile' [taking] middle-distance running into a new era. To many it still remains the greatest 1,500m race ever." In this race, both of the first two runners broke the previous world record.

The current world record in the actual mile was also set in a race where two athletes surpassed the previously standing world record—one might suggest it was a new record because the two had challenged each other to the finish.  In Rome, 1999 Hicham El Guerrouj ran a time of 3:43.13  and Noah Ngeny finished at 3:43.40. This was the first time in over 40 years that two men had bettered the world record in the mile in the same race although this race was not called the "Dream Mile."  See the race on YouTube

The first event called a "Dream Mile" was a match race between Jim Ryun and Marty Liquori on May 16, 1971.  The event took place at the Martin Luther King International Freedom Games at Franklin Field in Philadelphia, Pennsylvania. Bob Hersh of Track & Field News wrote, "The build-up was probably the greatest for any single footrace since the historic 'Miracle Mile' at Vancouver, British Columbia in 1954."

Ryun, who was known for his kick, was the favorite.  He had also run much faster than Villanova University's Liquori (3:51.1 to 3:57.2). The race went out slow, with both going 440 yards in the middle of the pack - slower than 61-seconds. Ryun took over at halfway (2:03.3). After the next turn, Liquori moved decisively. He passed the world record holder and led him through a lap in 56.7. In the last lap, Liquori would not surrender the lead. At the finish, Liquori prevailed as both clocked 3:54.6.

See also
 Mile run world record progression
 Four-minute mile
 Dicksonpokalen
 Emsley Carr Mile
 Wanamaker Mile

References

Mile races
Track and field competitions in the United States
Men's athletics competitions